Michael N. DeMers is a geographer and Professor Emeritus of geography at New Mexico State University.

Education and field
DeMers earned his Ph.D. in geography from the University of Kansas in 1985 and has taught geography and courses related to Geographic information systems since 1983. He specializes in Geographic information science, applying it to research in real-world problems in fields such as landscape ecology as well as researching its theoretical implications. He advocates for geographic education in public schools and has researched employing novel technologies such as second life in the classroom. 

GCERT, Online Teaching and Learning, NMSU, 2007
Ph.D., Geography, University of Kansas, 1985  
M.Phil., Geography, University of Kansas, 1983
M.S., Geography, University of North Dakota, 1980
B.S.Ed., Earth Science, University of North Dakota, 1974

Career
DeMers served as department head of the geography department at New Mexico State University between 2000 and 2004. He served in the past as President of the National Council for Geographic Education in 2014 (NCGE0). 

DeMers' research focuses on applying GIS to problems including water resources, big data, and species range expansion. He has contributed significantly to literature involving geographic information science and teaching geospatial concepts with novel technologies. He advocates teaching geography in public schools using geographic information systems.

Publications
He has published over seventy-five research articles on geographic topics and served as an editor, and contributed significantly to, the Geographic Information Science and Technology Body of Knowledge.

He has published six texts on geographic information systems (GIS), including:
GIS for Dummies
GIS Modeling in Raster
Fundamentals of Geographic Information Systems

Awards and recognition
In 2010, DeMers was awarded the Anderson Medal of Honor in Applied Geography “for exceptional accomplishments in applied geography education, research, and service to the profession and the wider public." The Anderson Medal of Honor is the highest honor the Applied Geography Specialty Group of the American Association of Geographers can give.

 Albert Nelson Marquis Lifetime Achievement Honoree, 2018 
 Albert Nelson Marquis Who’s Who Humanitarian Award, 2018
 New Mexico Geographic Information Council (NMGIC) Wheeler Peak Lifetime Achievement Award, 2018
 Quality Matters (QM) Certification, Geography 481 (Fundamentals of GIS), 2013
 Distinguished Alumni Award, University of North Dakota, 2013 
 Teaching Innovation Award, New Mexico State University Teaching Academy, 2011
 James R. Anderson Medal of Honor in Applied Geography, 2010 
 Albert Nelson Marquis Who’s Who in America, 2006
 Albert Nelson Marquis Who’s Who in Social Science Education, 2004
 Highest Award for Achievement, Dale Carnegie Training, Fall, 2003.

See also
Technical geography
Gamma Theta Upsilon

References

External links
NMSU Geography official website

American geographers
New Mexico State University faculty
1951 births
Living people
Geographic information scientists